Radiation-inducible immediate-early gene IEX-1 is a protein that in humans is encoded by the IER3 gene.

This gene functions in the protection of cells from Fas- or tumor necrosis factor type alpha-induced apoptosis. Partially degraded and unspliced transcripts are found after virus infection in vitro, but these transcripts are not found in vivo and do not generate a valid protein.

References

Further reading